Alecia Webb-Edgington is an American politician. She is a former Republican member of the Kentucky House of Representatives. She represented the 63rd District, which comprised part of Kenton County. Webb-Edgington was a candidate for the United States House of Representatives in the 2012 election. She sought to replace the retiring Geoff Davis in Kentucky's 4th congressional district, but was defeated by Lewis County Judge-Executive Thomas Massie.

Early life, education, and law enforcement career
She earned a bachelor's degree from Western Kentucky University in sociology and criminology. Then, she earned a master's degree from Eastern Kentucky University in criminal justice. She also went to the 52nd Annual National Security Seminar at the U.S. Army War College and the Executive Leadership Program at the Naval Postgraduate School.

She worked for the Kentucky State Police as the chief information officer and for the Kentucky Office of Homeland Security, where she became the first female head of the office.

Kentucky House of Representatives

Elections
In December 2007, incumbent Republican State Representative Jon Draud of the 63rd House District resigned his seat to become Kentucky Education Commissioner. She won the January 8th special election with 53% of the vote. She won re-election unopposed in 2008 and 2010.

Committee assignments
2011-2012
Appropriations and Revenue Committee
Education Committee
State Government Committee
Transportation Committee
Veterans, Military Affairs and Public Safety Committee
Appropriations and Revenue Committee
Education Committee
State Government Committee
Transportation Committee
Veterans, Military Affairs and Public Protection Committee

2009-2010
Education Committee (Vice Chair)
Interim Joint Committee on Education
Interim Joint Committee on State Government
Interim Joint Committee on Transportation
Interim Joint Committee on Veterans, Military Affairs & Public Protectio
Military Affairs and Public Safety Committee
State Government Committee
Subcommittee of Budget Review on Justice and Judiciary
Subcommittee on Elementary and Secondary Education
Subcommittee on Kentucky Waterways
Transportation Committee

2012 congressional election

After incumbent Republican U.S. Congressman Geoff Davis decided to retire, she decided to run in the newly redrawn Kentucky's 4th congressional district. She said "Congressman Geoff Davis leaves big shoes to fill. I applaud him for his effective leadership and wish him well as he returns to the private sector."

She was defeated by Thomas Massie during the GOP Primary, failing to garner more than 30% of the vote.

References

External links
Official campaign website

Republican Party members of the Kentucky House of Representatives
Living people
1966 births
Women state legislators in Kentucky
Western Kentucky University alumni
Eastern Kentucky University alumni
Chief information officers
21st-century American women